= Galagi =

- Village
- Location in Karnataka, India Galagi (India)
- Coordinates: 15°18′N 74°55′E
- Country: India
- State: Karnataka
- District: Dharwad
- Talukas: Kalaghatagi

Population (2011)
  - Total: 4,736

Languages
  - Official: Kannada
- Time zone: UTC+5:30 (IST)
- Nearest city: Dharwad

Galagi Hulkoppa is a village in Dharwad district of Karnataka, India.

== Demographics ==
As of the 2011 Census of India there were 932 households in Galagi and a total population of 4,736 consisting of 2,414 males and 2,322 females. There were 744 children ages 0-6.
